Merana is a commune (municipality) in the Province of Alessandria in the Italian region Piedmont, located about  southeast of Turin and about  southwest of Alessandria.

Merana borders the following municipalities: Piana Crixia, Serole, and Spigno Monferrato.

References

Cities and towns in Piedmont